Werner Ferrari (born December 29, 1946) is a Swiss serial killer. As a fivefold child murderer he is one of the most infamous inmates in Switzerland. His method was to kidnap or lure children away from popular festivals, abuse some of them and then strangle them.

Youth and first conviction 
Ferrari grew up in various nurseries and was considered an introvert. He did various jobs as a labourer.

In 1971, Ferrari committed his first murder in Reinach, Basel-Landschaft - there he murdered 10-year old Daniel Schwan. Ferrari was sentenced to 10 years imprisonment and was released after 8 years from the Zürich detention center in Regensdorf.

Killings 
Between May 1980 and August 1989, eleven children between the ages of 6 and 14 were abducted in eight different Swiss cantons. While eight were brutally murdered, three are still missing today: Peter Roth (8) from Mogelsberg, Sarah Oberson (6) from Saxon and Edith Trittenbass (9) from Gass-Wetzikon. This investigation is considered the longest running in Swiss history, with the duration being almost ten years.

On August 30, 1989, four days after the murder of Fabienne Imhof, Werner Ferrari called the police over the phone, saying that he had nothing to do with her death. Shortly thereafter, he was arrested in his apartment in Olten, and he confessed to four murders. However, Ferrari vehemently denied involvement in the murder of 12-year old Ruth Steinmann, who was found on 16 May 1980, in a wooded area near Würenlos.

Arrest and trial 
In 1995, Ferrari was sentenced by the Baden District Court for five murders to life imprisonment, including the murder of Steinmann. Seven years later, research by journalist and author Peter Holenstein revealed clues that Ferrari could not be responsible for that murder. Among other things, DNA analysis revealed that a pubic hair found on Steinmann's body did not match to Ferrari.

Due to Holenstein's research, the Canton of Aargau's Supreme Court overturned the 2004 conviction against Ferrari in the Steinmann case and dismissed it to the Baden District Court for reassessment. As a result, another suspect who had committed suicide in Wolfhalden in March 1983 was brought up. A dental report by the Scientific Service of the Zürich City Police revealed bite marks on the girl's body which were certainly not Ferrari's, but from the aforementioned suspect who looked very similar to him. In a nationwide revision process Werner Ferrarri was acquitted of Ruth Steinmann's murder on April 10, 2007, by the Baden District Court; however, he remains imprisoned for four other murders.

The victims 

 Daniel (died 1971 in Reinach, 10 years old)
 Benjamin (died 1983, 10 years old) from Kloten
 Daniel (died 1985, 7 years old) from Rümlang
 Christian (died 1987, 10 years old) from Windisch
 Fabienne (died 1989 in Hägendorf, 9 years old).

Literature 

 Peter Holenstein: The Unbelievable. The Murderous Life of Werner Ferrari.Oesch Verlag AG, Zürich 2002, .

Documentation 

 Daniela Dardel: The child murderer Werner Ferrarri. From the series of criminal cases that moved Switzerland. SF 2007. (Online-Video, 35 Minutes).

See also
List of serial killers by country

References

External links 

 Peter Holenstein: Das Rätsel vom «Chefihau». In: Die Weltwoche 17/2004.

1946 births
Living people
Male serial killers
Murder in Switzerland
Swiss serial killers
Swiss prisoners sentenced to life imprisonment
People convicted of murder by Switzerland
Prisoners sentenced to life imprisonment by Switzerland
Prisoners and detainees of Switzerland